The  was opened on November 18th, 2006, in Tottori, Japan, by the Tottori Sand Dunes, displaying sand sculptures in temporary facilities. On April 14th, 2012, it reopened as the world's first permanent indoor exhibition space dedicated to sand art, exhibiting works by fifteen international sculptors.

History 
The local tourism officer of the Tottori Sand Dunes, Shinji Tsutsui, was passionate about the Italian Renaissance, and invited the sand sculptor Katsuhiko Chaen to create a sand exhibit on that theme in 2006.

The first exhibit took place in November 2006. The first exhibits took place in a tent. In 2012, a permanent 21,000-square building became the home of the exhibit.

The museum won the 2021 Trip Advisors choice award for places to visit.

Description 
Each yearly exhibit starts in April, and last until January of the following year. The sand sculptures are then deliberately destroyed and a new exhibit is prepared from January to April. The  sand sculptor Katsuhiko Chaen is the chief sculptor. Despite the museum's proximity to the sand dunes, that sand cannot be used because the sand dunes are part of a protected national park. The sand came from a road building project. Only sand and water is used to create the sculptures.

Yearly exhibits

See also
 Sand art

References

External links
 The Sand Museum
 The Sand Museum at Google Cultural Institute
  The Sand Museum

Art museums and galleries in Japan
Museums in Tottori Prefecture
Tottori (city)
Sand
Sculptures by medium
Museums established in 2006
2006 establishments in Japan